Baby fat may refer to:
 Brown adipose tissue, a heat-generating type of tissue present in infants
 The fat roll on babies during the initial child development stages
 Childhood obesity

See also
Baby Phat